Frankfort is the capital city of the Commonwealth of Kentucky, United States, and the seat of Franklin County. It is a home rule-class city; the population was 28,602 at the 2020 census. Located along the Kentucky River, Frankfort is the principal city of the Frankfort, Kentucky Micropolitan Statistical Area, which includes all of Franklin and Anderson counties.

History

Pre-1900

The town of Frankfort likely received its name from an event that took place in the 1780s. Native Americans attacked a group of early European colonists from Bryan Station, who were on their way to make salt at Mann's Lick in Jefferson County. Pioneer Stephen Frank was killed at the Kentucky River and the settlers thereafter called the crossing "Frank's Ford". This name was later elided to Frankfort.

In 1786, James Wilkinson purchased a  tract of land on the north side of the Kentucky River, which developed as downtown Frankfort. He was an early promoter of Frankfort as the state capital. Wilkinson felt Frankfort would be a center of transportation using the Kentucky River to ship farm produce to the Ohio River and then to the Mississippi and on to New Orleans.   

After Kentucky became the 15th state in 1792, five commissioners from various counties were appointed, on 20 June 1792, to choose a location for the capital. They were John Allen and John Edwards (both from Bourbon County), Henry Lee (from Mason), Thomas Kennedy (from Madison), and Robert Todd (from Fayette). A number of communities competed for this honor, but Frankfort won.  According to early histories, the offer of Andrew Holmes' log house as capitol for seven years, a number of town lots, £50 worth of locks and hinges, 10 boxes of glass, 1,500 pounds of nails, and $3,000 in gold helped the decision go to Frankfort.

Frankfort had a United States post office by 1794, with Daniel Weisiger as postmaster. On 1 October 1794, Weisiger sent the first quarterly account to Washington.

John Brown, a Virginia lawyer and statesman, built a home now called Liberty Hall in Frankfort in 1796. Before Kentucky statehood, he represented Virginia in the Continental Congress (1777−78) and the U.S. Congress (1789−91). While in Congress, he introduced the bill granting statehood to Kentucky. After statehood, he was elected by the state legislature as one of the state's U.S. Senators.

In 1796, the Kentucky General Assembly appropriated funds to provide a house to accommodate the governor; it was completed two years later. The Old Governor's Mansion is claimed to be the oldest official executive residence still in use in the United States. In 1829, Gideon Shryock designed the Old Capitol, Kentucky's third, in Greek Revival style. It served Kentucky as its capitol from 1830 to 1910. The separate settlement known as South Frankfort was annexed by the city on 3 January 1850.

The Argus of Western America was published in Frankfort from 1808 until 1830.

During the American Civil War, the Union Army built fortifications overlooking Frankfort on what is now called Fort Hill. The Confederate Army also occupied Frankfort for a short time, starting on 3 September 1862, the only such time that Confederate forces took control of a Union capitol.

The Clinton Street High School, a segregated public school for African American students in Frankfort operated from either 1882 or 1884 until 1928.

20th-century

On 3 February 1900, William Goebel was assassinated in Frankfort while walking to the capitol on the way to the Kentucky Legislature. Goebel, apparent loser of the election for governor was contesting the outcome.  Former Secretary of State Caleb Powers and several others were later found guilty of a conspiracy to murder Goebel, however all were later pardoned.

The Mayo–Underwood School, the successor to the Clinton Street High School, was a public school for African American students in Frankfort and operated from 1929 until 1964. The school was torn down as part of an urban renewal plan, and to make way for the Capital Plaza.

The Capital Plaza was comprised the Capital Plaza Office Tower, the tallest building in the city, the Capital Plaza Hotel (formerly the Holiday Inn, Frankfort), and the Fountain Place Shoppes. The Capital Plaza Office Tower opened in 1972 and became a visual landmark for the center of the city. By the early 2000s, maintenance of the concrete structures had been neglected and the plaza had fallen into disrepair, with sections of the plaza closed to pedestrian activity out of concerns for safety. 

Frankfort grew considerably with state government in the 1960s. A modern addition to the State Office Building was completed in 1967. The original building was completed in the 1930s on the location of the former Kentucky State Penitentiary. Some of the stone from the old prison was used for the walls surrounding the office building.

21st-century 
Although there was some rapid economic and population growth in the 1960s, both tapered off in the 1980s and have remained fairly stable since that time.

In August 2008, state government officials recommended demolition of the Capital Plaza Office Tower and redevelopment of the area over a period of years. Ten years later, the demolition of the office tower was completed on Sunday, March 11, 2018, and was televised by WKYT-TV on WKYT-DT2, as well as streamed live on Facebook. Demolition of the nearby convention center, which opened in 1972 and has hosted sporting events, concerts, and other local events, was completed in spring 2018. State officials replaced the outdated office tower with a smaller building called the Mayo–Underwood Building (2019), in order to create a more pedestrian-oriented scale at the complex, to encourage street activity.

Frankfort is home to three distilleries including the Buffalo Trace Distillery (Kentucky Bourbon), Castle & Key Distillery (spirits), and Three Boys Farm Distillery (bourbon and whiskey).

In 2018, thousands of teachers protested at the city in response to Senate Bill 151 having been passed on 29 March 2018.

Geography

Frankfort is located in the (inner) Bluegrass region of Central Kentucky.  The city is bisected by the Kentucky River, which makes an s-turn as it passes through the center of town. The river valley widens at this point, which creates four distinct parts of town. The valley within the city limits contains Downtown and South Frankfort districts, which lie opposite one another on the river. A small neighborhood with its own distinct identity, Bellepoint, is located on the west bank of the river to the north of Benson Creek, opposite the river from the "downtown" district. The suburban areas on either side of the valley are respectively referred to as the "West Side" and "East Side" (or "West Frankfort" and "East Frankfort").

Frankfort does not have a commercial airport and travelers fly into Blue Grass Airport in Lexington, the closest; Cincinnati/Northern Kentucky International Airport near Covington or Louisville International Airport in Louisville.  Capital City Airport serves general and military aviation.

Climate
Frankfort has a humid subtropical climate with four distinct seasons. Winter is generally cool with some snowfall. Spring and fall are both mild and relatively warm, with ample precipitation and thunderstorm activity. Summers are hot and humid.

Demographics

Census detail from 2020: As of the 2020 Census, there were 28,602 people, 12,434 households, and 6,053 families residing in the city. The racial makeup of the city was 75.1% White or European American (74.1% non-Hispanic), 13.3% Black or African American, 0.2% Native American, 2.6% Asian, 0.0% Pacific Islander, 1.8% from other races, and 4.8% from two or more races. Hispanics or Latinos of any race were 5.2% of the population.

There were 12,434 households, out of which 27.9% had children under the age of 18 living with them, 32,6% were married couples living together, 16.7% had a female householder with no husband present, 5.1% had a male householder with no wife present, and 45.7% were non-families. 38.3% of all households were made up of individuals, and 12.2% had someone living alone who was 65 years of age or older.  The average household size was 2.12 and the average family size was 2.83.

The age distribution was 19.8% under 18, 13.1% from 18 to 24, 26.6% from 25 to 44, 25.5% from 45 to 64, and 16.1% who were 65 or older.  The median age was 36.7 years. For every 100 females, there were 92.9 males.  For every 100 females age 18 and over, there were 89.4 males.

The median income for a household in the city was $50,211, and the median income for a family was $43,949. Full-time male workers had a median income of $37,445 versus $34,613 for females. The per capita income was $29,288.  About 19.8% of families and 16.3% of the population were below the poverty line, including 38.7% of those under age 18 and 7.5% of those age 65 or over.

Frankfort is the focal point of a micropolitan statistical area consisting of Frankfort and Franklin County as well as adjacent Lawrenceburg and Anderson County.  The city is also classified in a combined statistical area with Lexington and Richmond to the east.

Frankfort's municipal population makes it the fourth smallest capital city in the United States.

Parks and recreation
The city operates nine parks:
Capitol View—playing fields, nature trails, picnic areas
Cove Spring—240 acres, nature trails, picnic areas, archery range
Dolly Graham—basketball courts, picnic, community garden, playground
East Frankfort—nature trails, dog park, picnic areas, playgrounds, volleyball court, 18-hole disc golf course.
Juniper Hill Park—124 acres, pool, golf course, play areas, picnic areas, war memorials
Lakeview (operated jointly with Franklin County)—ball fields, golf course, horse show arena, skatepark
Leslie Morris Park on Fort Hill—American Civil War battlefield, wilderness forest, forts, trails
River View—picnic area along the Kentucky River, walking trail with historic cultural sites, amphitheatre, boat ramp, farmers market
Todd Park—trail, picnic areas, community garden

Other recreation in the area:

 Walk/Bike Frankfort - Volunteer group to improve the city for pedestrians and cyclists.

 Josephine Sculpture Park - Provides community arts education and creative experiences.
 The Folkbike Re-Cyclery - Volunteer organization that restores and repairs used bicycles, and then gives them to riders who cannot afford to buy one.

Education

Kentucky State University is located with the Frankfort city limits. KSU (also known as KYSU) is  a public historically black university and an 1890 land-grant institution.

Two public school districts serve the city, with three public high schools within the city limits.

Frankfort Independent School District serves the downtown neighborhoods including Downtown, South Frankfort, Bellepoint and Tanglewood. FIS operates The Early Learning Academy (a preschool), Second Street School (primary and middle grades), Frankfort High School, and Panther Transition Academy (a non-traditional high school program).

Franklin County Public Schools serves the rest of the city and county, including seven elementary schools (Bridgeport, Collins Lane, Early Learning Village, Elkhorn, Hearn, Peaks Mill, Westridge), two middle schools (Bondurant, Elkhorn), and two high schools (Franklin County High School and Western Hills High School).

There are several private schools in the area, including Capital Day School, Frankfort Christian Academy, and Good Shepherd Catholic School.

Frankfort  has a lending library, Paul Sawyier Public Library, named in 1965 after the watercolor artist Paul Sawyier whose many paintings document the history of the area.

Points of interest

Kentucky State Capitol building, built 1909
Kentucky Governor's Mansion, residence of the Governor of Kentucky, built 1914
Old State Capitol building, now a museum, built 1837
Courthouse, built 1887
Singing Bridge, a 125 year old bridge that crosses the Kentucky River, built 1893
Liberty Hall, historic house museum, built 1796
Fort Hill, a hill overlooking downtown, American Civil War site, now a park
Frankfort Cemetery, historic military monuments and final resting place of numerous statesmen and famous figures, established 1844
Corner in Celebrities Historic District
Buffalo Trace Distillery, built 1792
Jesse R. Zeigler House (private), Kentucky's only Frank Lloyd Wright, built 1909

 Capital City Museum, a repository of the history of Frankfort and Franklin County

Transportation
U.S. Route 60 and U.S. Route 460 pass east-west through Frankfort. U.S. Route 127 and U.S. Route 421 pass north-south through Frankfort. Interstate 64 passes to the south of the city.

Capital City Airport, a public use airport, is one mile southwest of the central business district of Frankfort. The nearest airport with commercial flights is Blue Grass Airport, 22 miles southeast of Frankfort.

Frankfort Union Station was a medium scale hub passenger train station for north-central Kentucky. It served the Chesapeake & Ohio Railway, the Frankfort and Cincinnati Railroad and the Louisville and Nashville Railroad.<ref>Official Guide of the Railways, June 1921, p. 1294</ref> Until the mid-1950s, Union Station served Louisville-Ashland sections of the C&O's Sportsman. Until 1971, the C&O's George Washington stopped in Frankfort.Louisville & Nashville timetable, December 1948, Tables 10, 20

Notable people

 William Wirt Adams (1819−88), brigadier general in the Confederate Army
 Thomas Carlin, seventh Governor of Illinois
 Will Chase, actor and singer best known for Broadway musicals and ABC series Nashville Elijah Craig, Baptist preacher and early bourbon distiller, moved to Frankfort from Virginia in the 1780s
 Tim Farmer, outdoorsman and television presenter; host of Kentucky Afield''
 William Goebel, 34th Governor of Kentucky
 John Marshall Harlan, U.S. Supreme Court justice
 Elizabeth Ann Hulette, professional wrestling manager
 Grover Land (1884−1958), professional baseball player
 Archer Prewitt, musician and cartoonist
 J. T. Riddle, professional baseball player for the Minnesota Twins
 Green Pinckney Russell (1861/1863–1939), American school administrator, college president, and teacher
 Paul Sawyier (1865−1917), Kentucky Impressionist artist
 Arthur St. Clair, 1700s soldier and politician, after which St Clair Street is named
 Landon Addison Thomas (1799−1889), state legislator
 George Graham Vest (1830−1904), U.S. Senator from Missouri, best known for popularizing the notion that a dog is a man's best friend
 James Wilkinson, who named Mero St. after his paymaster, Louisiana Governor Esteban Rodríguez Miró.
 Anne Elizabeth Wilson (1901-1946), writer, poet, editor
 George C. Wolfe (1954−), Broadway producer, playwright, and film director

Sister cities
 Shimamoto, Osaka Prefecture, Japan

Gallery

References

External links

Official site
Frankfort Information page from Kentucky Secretary of State 

 
Cities in Kentucky
Cities in Franklin County, Kentucky
County seats in Kentucky
Populated places established in 1786
Frankfort, Kentucky micropolitan area
1786 establishments in Virginia